Feuchtwang is a German surname. Notable people with the surname include:

David Feuchtwang (1864–1936), Jewish scholar and author
Stephan Feuchtwang (born 1937), British anthropologist and professor

See also
Feuchtwanger

German-language surnames